Temple Emanuel Sinai (Hebrew: עִמָנוּאֵל סִינַי, God is with us Sinai) is a medium-sized Reform (progressive) Jewish synagogue located in Worcester, Massachusetts, New England's second largest city (population 206,518).

A product of the 2013 integration of Worcester's two original Reform congregations (Temple Emanuel and Temple Sinai), the synagogue traces its roots to 1921 and is affiliated with the Union for Reform Judaism (URJ), a network of over 900 progressive congregations representing the largest denomination (38%) of affiliated American Jews.

The congregation worships and studies at 661 Salisbury Street, adjacent to the Worcester Jewish Community Center, where Temple Sinai acquired property for its permanent home in 1962. Temple Emanuel's building at 280 May Street was sold to the Worcester State University Foundation in 2013, though the terms of the sale allowed the congregation to use the building for two additional years, until June 2015. Planning to determine a final siting for the synagogue concluded during the fall of 2014, resulting in a plan to expand and renovate the Temple Sinai facility at 661 Salisbury Street (rather than share a campus with Conservative Congregation Beth Israel at Beth Israel's location on Jamesbury Drive).

Temple Emanuel Sinai's first rabbi, Matthew Berger, also served as the last rabbi of Temple Emanuel, who hired him in 2009. In February 2014, Rabbi Valerie Cohen, spiritual leader since 2003 at Jackson, Mississippi's Beth Israel Congregation accepted an offer to replace Berger at the end of his contract in June 2014. A near-unanimous vote in favor of ratifying Rabbi Cohen's contract was held during a special congregational meeting at the May Street campus on March 9, 2014.

Temple Emanuel

Founded in 1921, Emanuel was the first of two Reform congregations founded in Worcester and was the largest synagogue (of any kind) in the city from the 1940s until 2013 when it integrated with its own offshoot, Temple Sinai. The congregation's third home, its largest, was completed and consecrated at 280 May Street in 1949, though it was significantly expanded in 1961 to accommodate a burgeoning religious school enrollment of nearly 1,000 students. Membership peaked at 1,340 families in 1957, making it one of the largest Reform congregations in the country at the time. As late as 1982, Temple Emanuel was still the second-largest Reform congregation in New England. By 2009, membership had fallen to 425 families.

Notably, Temple Emanuel had two long-tenured rabbis who were influential in the larger Worcester community, and in the Reform movement. Levi Olan (1929–1948) became the first Jewish president of the Worcester Ministerial Union and grew Temple membership from less than 200 families to 610 families during his tenure. Joseph Klein (1949–1996) continued Olan's tradition of interfaith leadership and also served as president of the Worcester Ministers' Association and the Greater Worcester Clergy Association. Membership grew during his tenure from 610 families to 1,340 families in 1957, before seeing a gradual decline.

Temple Sinai

In a letter dated December 16, 1957, the "Steering Committee of Temple Sinai", a small group of Temple Emanuel members who felt that the close family atmosphere of the Temple had been lost and that religious observance had become more conservative over the years, informed the secretary of the board of Temple Emanuel that they intended to create a second Reform congregation in Worcester. Temple Sinai's Statement of Principles indicated it would limit membership to 500 families.

Integration

Due to declining membership and increasing financial hardship resulting from demographic changes in Worcester's Jewish community, Temple Emanuel and Temple Sinai members engaged in re-integration discussions on December 9, 2011, when after 54 years of separation and at least 20 years of coaxing from the URJ, Temple Sinai leadership officially contacted Temple Emanuel to pursue it.

Temple Emanuel leadership listed its May Street campus for sale in 2012 when integration discussions with Temple Sinai concluded that Sinai's campus at 661 Salisbury Street was an ideal location for the new congregation. At a congregational meeting on May 30, 2013, the sale of the building at 280 May Street to the Worcester State University Foundation was approved by Temple Emanuel membership. The proposed re-integration with Temple Sinai was approved by the members of both congregations in June 2013. Both congregations had already voted to name the new entity "Temple Emanuel Sinai".

Rabbinical leadership

Matthew Berger served as Rabbi of Temple Emanuel from 2009 to 2013.

Cantorial leadership

Kim Singer served as Cantor of Temple Sinai from 2008 to 2013.

Photo gallery

Temple Emanuel history

Early history (1920–1948)

On June 29, 1920, sixty men whose families had moved from the Jewish enclave of Union Hill on Worcester's working class East Side to the more fashionable West Side met at the Bancroft Hotel in downtown Worcester to discuss plans to raise funds for the establishment of a synagogue on the West Side. In 1921, they began holding services (in a Modern Orthodox style) above Easton's tea room at Harrington Corner in downtown Worcester. In 1921, the group officially incorporated as the "Worcester Modern Congregation" and in 1922 opened its first synagogue in a home at 22 Suburban Road in Worcester, calling it the "West Side Community House". By 1923, the congregation had outgrown its facility and moved into the former Bancroft School building at 111 Elm Street, naming it Temple Emanuel. The congregation gradually adopted Reform practices and affiliated officially with the national movement, under the leadership of Rabbi Levi Olan, in 1937. In 1949, the congregation moved to its final home at the junction of May and Chandler Streets.

Temple Emanuel was active in the Civil Rights Movement from very early in its history. In March 1931, the Temple's Brotherhood hosted a symposium of four lectures on the "Foundations of the Race Problem", including a lecture by NAACP co-founder W. E. B. Du Bois on March 11.

Joseph Klein era (1949–1977)

The Temple's longest-serving rabbi, Joseph Klein, began his duties on January 1, 1949, retired in 1977, and would remain on the pulpit as Rabbi Emeritus until his death in 1996. Klein is famously credited with inspiring at least eight young congregants at Temple Emanuel to attend Hebrew Union College, the Union for Reform Judaism's Rabbinical seminary, including the immediate past President of the Union for Reform Judaism, Rabbi Eric Yoffie.

Rabbi Klein also mentored Yoffie's predecessor, Rabbi Alexander M. Schindler who was hired in 1953 as Temple Emanuel's first Assistant Rabbi. Schindler served as Assistant Rabbi from 1953 to 1955 and as Associate Rabbi from 1955 to 1959 when he left the congregation to become Executive Director of the New England Region of what was then known as the UAHC. Rabbi Schindler was elected president of the UAHC in 1973, serving as the leader of North America's Reform Jews until 1996.

In 1957, Temple Emanuel's membership peaked at 1,340 member families (including 42 families who were also members of the Conservative Congregation Beth Israel). Worcester's ten other Jewish congregations, including Shaarai Torah, had a combined family membership of 1,410.

In his retirement, Klein went on to serve (part-time) as the first Rabbi of Temple Beth-El in Las Cruces, New Mexico until 1984 when he and his wife Rose returned to Worcester. He then served, actively, as Rabbi Emeritus of Temple Emanuel until his death at the age of 84 on Sunday September 29, 1996. Also of note, Klein was the great-grandfather of Hollywood actress Alisan Porter (Curly Sue) who won season 10 of NBC's The Voice.

Significant events

From 1959 to 1962, Temple Emanuel hosted a series of lectures called Temple Forum which saw Hubert Humphrey (April 12, 1959), Martin Luther King Jr. (March 12, 1961), Theodore Bikel (1962), and Eleanor Roosevelt (1962) all speak to the congregation.

In 1965, Herbie Hancock and other jazz legends accompanied 17-year-old congregant and conductor Jonathan Klein to record "Hear O Israel: A Prayer Ceremony in Jazz."

Temple Emanuel was the site, on August 25, 1967, of the funeral for Dr. Gregory C. Pincus, an American biologist and researcher who co-invented the birth-control pill.

Post-Klein era (1977–2013)

In 1977, Temple Emanuel elected Rabbi Stanley Davids to succeed Klein as its 5th spiritual leader. Rabbi Davids introduced the Temple's Chavurah program and brought the Gates of Prayer - New Union Prayerbook to the congregation. Rabbi Davids left in 1986 to become Rabbi of Central Synagogue in New York City.

On April 19, 1989, the funeral for Abbie Hoffman, the famous 1960's radical, founder of the Yippies and member of the Chicago Seven who had died at the age of 52 one week earlier, was held in Temple Emanuel's Persky sanctuary. Over 900 people were in attendance and an overflow crowd of hundreds more listened outside the temple over a loudspeaker. In attendance were basketball star Bill Walton, folk singer Pete Seeger, movie producer Bert Schneider, fellow Yippie Aron Kay, Republican political consultant Jay Severin, Hoffman's cousin and Pulitzer Prize-winning journalist Sydney Schanberg, and Jerry Rubin, fellow Chicago Seven member.

Temple Emanuel celebrated its 70th anniversary on October 25, 1991, by honoring four people who had made significant impacts on the congregation. Then-Vice President of the Union for Reform Judaism Rabbi Eric Yoffie, who grew up in the congregation, gave the sermon. Klein and past presidents Milton S. Sheftel, Judith S. Yoffie and Wallace W. Wolf (posthumously) were honored.

On June 12, 2003, the congregation officially installed Carlton Watson, a black man who had converted to Judaism, as its president. Watson, executive director of the Henry Lee Willis Community Center in Worcester, is believed to be the first black person to serve as president of a synagogue in the United States.

Longmeadow native Rabbi Matthew L. Berger served as Temple Emanuel's ninth and last spiritual leader from July 2009 through June 2013. Berger served as the rabbi of Temple Emanuel Sinai for its first year of existence (June 2013 through June 2014) until he was replaced by Rabbi Valerie Cohen. Cohen had previously been the rabbi of Temple Israel in Memphis, Tennessee, and Beth Israel Congregation of Jackson, Mississippi.

Education

Historically, Temple Emanuel's renowned Religious School met three days per week during the school year (Monday and Wednesday afternoons for Hebrew and Saturday mornings to study Torah, liturgy, Israel and Jewish culture) in the Temple's three-story classroom wing. In the mid-2000s the schedule was reduced to just Wednesday afternoons and Saturday mornings. The school worshipped together at the conclusion of classes every Saturday in the Temple's Stacey A. Cohan youth center.

In 2012, Temple Emanuel joined Congregation Beth Israel and Temple Sinai in creating PaRDes - The Worcester Jewish Community Religious School, under the auspices of the Jewish Federation of Central Massachusetts. The school's roughly 130 students attended Monday and Wednesday afternoon classes at Beth Israel and Saturday mornings at Temple Emanuel Sinai until the community school was disbanded and the congregational schools were re-established in 2016.

Facilities

Temple Emanuel's home from 1949 to 2013, designed by Boston architect Charles R. Greco, is located at the junction of May and Chandler Streets in the heart of Worcester's leafy, residential West Side, adjacent to Worcester State University. The original structure, built in brick and designed in the Colonial Revival style, was consecrated in 1949. A 1,000-seat auditorium, a second classroom wing, and a suite of clergy offices were added in 1961.

The Temple's two-story 1961 classroom wing was leased to a series of educational institutions once religious school enrollment began to decline in the 1970s, including Worcester State University, the Abby Kelley Foster Charter Public School, Y.O.U., Inc.'s Kathleen Burns Preparatory School, and Quinsigamond Community College's Training and Education center.

Dedicated spaces
Abraham & Mae Persky Sanctuary (918/626 seats)
Philip & Mary Rose Chapel (174 seats)
Stacy A. Cohan Youth Center
Joseph and Sophie Cohan Nursery School Playground

In 2011, the Persky sanctuary underwent its only major renovation. The first 6 rows of pews were removed to make room for an extended, lower bimah (speaker's platform) that was intended to create a more intimate atmosphere and enable the congregation to use the space more frequently. This reduced the capacity of the sanctuary from 918 to 626.

Parsonage

Temple Emanuel did not own a parsonage, but Rabbis Olan and Klein both resided at 5 Montvale Road in Worcester's exclusive Montvale Historic District.

Worship

Daily Minyan

Temple Emanuel was unique among American Reform synagogues in that for most of its history, it offered its members and the Worcester Jewish community the opportunity to attend a worship service seven days per week. In addition to clergy-led Shabbat services every Friday evening and Saturday morning, the congregation had a regular lay-led weekday minyan, which was held five days every week (Sunday through Thursday) from 1954 until 2011 when the 9:30 AM Sunday Shacharit (morning prayers) service was discontinued due to low attendance.

The "Daily Minyan" was originally instituted by Rabbi Klein on January 4, 1954, though it was led exclusively by lay leaders of the congregation. Temple Emanuel Sinai has continued the tradition of holding weekday services, though Mincha (afternoon prayers) and Maariv (evening prayers) are only read in the Salisbury Street sanctuary on Mondays at 5:45 PM. (The Tuesday evening service was discontinued by Temple Emanuel in 2012 and Wednesday and Thursday evening services were discontinued by Emanuel Sinai in early 2014.)

Shabbat

Regular Shabbat services were traditionally held Friday evenings at 7:00 and Saturday mornings at 10:30.

Temple Emanuel photo gallery

Temple Emanuel rabbinical leadership

Temple Emanuel assistant/associate rabbis 

Stuart W. Gershon served as Interim Senior Rabbi 1991–1992.
Sigma F. Coran served as Interim Senior Rabbi 1998–1999.

Temple Emanuel auxiliary rabbis 

Due to a decline in membership, Temple Emanuel's full-time assistant rabbi position was eliminated in June 1998. From that time through June 2009, the Temple was served by one full-time Rabbi with the assistance of a part-time Auxiliary Rabbi (or 2002–2004, a full-time cantor). From 2009 to 2013, all pastoral duties were performed by the Rabbi.

During 2002–2004, Cantor Sally Neff assisted in performance of pastoral duties.

Temple Emanuel cantorial leadership

Temple Sinai history

Temple Sinai held services for its first 5 years (1957 to 1962) at the Worcester Jewish Community Center, which had moved in 1951 to Temple Emanuel's old building at 111 Elm Street. In 1962, Sinai moved to a 42-acre estate the congregation had purchased at 661 Salisbury Street, holding services and religious school in a large mansion. In 1980, the congregation opened its first purpose-built synagogue on the site, keeping the mansion intact for offices and religious school use. The Jewish Community Center, also outgrowing the facility on Elm Street, built on land next door at 633 Salisbury Street and moved in 1967.

Temple Sinai at first embraced many of the customs of "Classical" Reform Judaism that Temple Emanuel did not practice. For example, Sinai members shed traditional religious garments like Kippot (skullcaps) and Tallitot (prayer shawls), though those customs returned over the years.

The congregation hired its first rabbi, Leonard Helman, previously an assistant rabbi at what was then known as Temple Beth Israel in West Hartford, Connecticut, in 1958. He was succeeded by Rabbis John Rosenblatt and Michael Berenbaum. David Kaplan served as Cantorial soloist in its early days. Rabbi Gary Glickstein followed as rabbi from 1977 to 1985 and was succeeded by Rabbi Seth Bernstein, Temple Sinai's longest tenured spiritual leader, from 1986 to 2011. Cantor Wendy Autenrieth served the congregation as Cantor/Educator from 1987 to 1999.

Temple Sinai rabbinical leadership

Temple Sinai cantorial leadership

Temple Sinai photo gallery

Prominent alumni

Rabbis

Cantors 

Alan F. Segal, Professor of Religion and Ingeborg Rennert Professor of Jewish Studies at Barnard College
Paul D. Eisenberg, Professor Emeritus of Philosophy at Indiana University
Jay Gordon, Host of Elvis Only on WODS, Oldies 103.3 FM (Boston, MA)
Jeffrey Hodes, Co-Executive Producer, 3rd Rock from the Sun (2000–2001)

Prominent members
Samuel Adler, Composer
Harriette L. Chandler, Massachusetts State Senator (Democrat, First Worcester District)
Arthur E. Chase, Former Massachusetts State Senator (Republican)
Joseph C. Casdin (died 2007 age 93) Mayor of Worcester 1959, 62–63, 67–68
Harold Devine (died 1998 age 88), 1928 Olympic Bronze Medal Recipient in Boxing
Joanne Goldstein, Secretary of Labor and Workforce Development, Commonwealth of Massachusetts 2010–2014
Jacob Hiatt, businessman and philanthropist.
Abbie Hoffman, 1960's radical and founder of the Yippies
Myra Kraft, late wife of Robert Kraft, owner of the New England Patriots
Harry C. Payne, President of Williams College 1994–1999
Denise Eisenberg Rich, songwriter, socialite, philanthropist, and political fundraiser, ex-wife of Marc Rich
Warren M. Robbins, Founder of the National Museum of African Art
David B. Yoffie, Director of Intel Corporation

Worcester West Side Synagogue history

Worcester has five operating synagogues, with two other organizations holding regular Jewish worship services in the city.

Other assemblies
Clark University Hillel
Jewish Healthcare Center chapel ("Congregation Mogen David")

Photo gallery

Worcester East Side Synagogue history

Before the Jewish population of Worcester shifted from Union Hill to the West Side, the community had established 12 Orthodox synagogues on the East Side.

Photo gallery

References

External links
 
 

Synagogues in Worcester, Massachusetts
Reform synagogues in Massachusetts
Jewish organizations established in 1920
1920 establishments in Massachusetts
Synagogues completed in 1949
1949 establishments in Massachusetts
Colonial Revival architecture in Massachusetts
Colonial Revival synagogues
Synagogues completed in 1980